The following is a list of independent pharmaceutical, biotechnology and medical companies listed on a stock exchange (as indicated) with current market capitalization of at least US$10 billion, ranked by their market capitalization.

It does not include biotechnology companies that are currently owned by, or form a part of, larger pharmaceutical groups.

Ranking by market capitalization
The following table lists the largest biotechnology and pharmaceutical companies ranked by market capitalization in billion USD dollars. The change column indicates the company's relative position in this list compared to their relative position in the preceding year; i.e., an increase would be moving closer to rank 1 and vice versa.

  – Biotechnology company
  – Pharmaceutical company

See also
List of largest biomedical companies by revenue

References

 
Biotechnology